The attorney general of Idaho is an elected office that assists local law enforcement agencies in the state of Idaho. They provide legal representation for state agencies, state corporations and any persons holding ownership of property, as well as enforcing consumer protection laws. They advise state officials and entities in relation to the law. The incumbent attorney general is Raúl Labrador, who was first elected in 2022. Although the attorney general has a four-year term, there are no limits on how many attempts that an incumbent can run for office. 

Idaho was admitted to the Union on July 3, 1890. The Office of Attorney General of the State of Idaho was created by the Constitution of Idaho, 1889, Art. IV, Sec. 1.

Qualifications 
Candidates for attorney general must be a good-standing member of the Idaho State Bar, a U.S. citizen, at least 30 years of age, and a resident of Idaho for at least two years prior to the election.

Attorneys general of the Territory of Idaho
Idaho Territory was created from Dakota Territory, Nebraska Territory, and Washington Territory on March 4, 1863.

The Office of Territorial Attorney General was created in 1885 (Laws of the Territory of Idaho, 1885, p. 31).

Officeholders

See also

 Full list of Idaho statewide elected officials below

References

External links
 
 Idaho Attorney General official website
 Idaho Attorney General articles at ABA Journal
 News and Commentary at FindLaw
 Idaho Statutes at Law.Justia.com
 U.S. Supreme Court Opinions - "Cases with title containing: State of Idaho" at FindLaw
 Idaho State Bar
 Idaho Attorney General Lawrence Wasden profile at National Association of Attorneys General
 Press releases at Idaho Attorney General